Z800 may refer to:

 Kawasaki Z800 - a motorcycle
 Sony Ericsson Z800i - a mobile phone model
 Zilog Z800 - a 16-bit microprocessor designed by Zilog
 Z800 3DVisor - a head-mounted display manufactured by eMagin
 Verizon Wireless Z800 - a CDMA cellphone manufactured by Sharp
 Z800 - Hewlett Packard Z-series dual CPU Intel-based workstation